An autobike is a bicycle with an automatic transmission that shifts gears without intervention from the rider.

The original Autobike was equipped with a system of centrifugal weights on the rear wheel with a rear derailleur attached to them. When the rider started pedaling it would cause the weights to spin outwards, which shifted the derailleur to a higher gear. When the rider stops pedaling and the bike comes to a stop, the weights would return to the centre position, shifting the bike into its lowest gear to get started.
Pictures showing the original autobike owned by me (caporal30). on Nov 2022 ..I still own that bike to this day.

The current Autobike uses three main components in its automatic transmission. In order to provide the system with power, the front wheel uses a hub dynamo to generate electricity. Wires connect the dynamo through the frame to the bottom bracket area where it joins a small onboard computer with sensors that detect the rider's speed and cadence. The computer uses this information to actuate a motorised shifter mounted on the rear wheel's hub gear to change the gear ratio. The rear hub used is the Nuvinci N360 CVP which is a continuously variable transmission using a planetary gear system that can be shifted smoothly at any time, under any load.

Bicycles